Amici come prima is a 2018 Italian comedy film directed by Christian De Sica.

Cast

References

External links

2018 films
Films directed by Christian De Sica
Films scored by Bruno Zambrini
2010s Italian-language films
2018 comedy films
Italian comedy films
2010s Italian films